Torture and the Ticking Bomb is a 2007 book by Bob Brecher in which the author examines ticking time bomb scenario, provides arguments against justifying torture based on consequentialist grounds and attacks interrogational torture and its legalisation.

References

External links 
 Torture and the Ticking Bomb

2007 non-fiction books
Ethics books
Torture
Wiley-Blackwell books